Yenisey-STM Rugby Club is a Russian rugby union club founded in 1975. It is one of the two powerful Krasnoyarsk clubs, the other being their cross town rivals Krasny Yar. They participate in the Professional Rugby League, the premier rugby championship of Russia, and in 2015–16 qualified for the European Rugby Challenge Cup, making them the first Russian rugby union club ever to compete in a major European club competition. With an operating budget of €3.5m they are largest club in Russia.

History 
The club was founded in 1975 as Trud Krasnoyarsk ("labour"), but in 1978 was renamed Sibtyazhmash Krasnoyarsk. It took its current name on 12 April 2000. STM is an abbreviation for Sibtyazhmash ("Siberian Heavy Machinery", a local firm), while the Yenisei is the river that flows through Krasnoyarsk. The club competed in the European Rugby Challenge Cup since 2015–16 season.
Enisei-STM is a two-time holder of the European Rugby Continental Shield. They are the first club outside of England, France, Ireland and Wales, which has won any European competition. Also Enisei-STM is the only owner of the European trophy, which is geographically based in Asia.

Siberian derby 
Krasny Yar and Enisei-STM are based on the left and right banks of the Yenisei River. The first city derby took place on 1990, when the Enisei-STM rose from the lower leagues to the Soviet Championship. Krasny Yar played at the highest level since 1977. In the 1990s, the derby passed with the advantage of Krasny Yar. But since the 00's, Enisei-STM was able to reverse the course of history. 
The Siberian derby took place in Krasnoyarsk, Abakan, Shushenskoye, Chita, Moscow, Simferopol, Krasnodar and Edinburgh. At the moment (June 27, 2022), 144 games were played in the Russian Championship, the Russian Cup, the Russian Supercup and the European Rugby Continental Shield. Enisei-STM won 80 times, Krasny Yar won 60 times, 4 matches ended in a draw. Since 2016, the winner of the first derby of the season has been awarded the Nikolaev Cup in honor of the legendary Krasnoyarsk rugby player and coach Yuri Nikolaev (1962–2013).

Honours 
 Russian Championships (12): 1999, 2002, 2005, 2011, 2012, 2014, 2016, 2017, 2018, 2019, 2020–21, 2021-22
 Runner-up (9): 2000, 2001, 2003, 2004, 2007, 2009, 2010, 2013, 2015
 Russian Cup (9): 2000, 2001, 2008, 2014, 2016, 2017, 2020, 2021, 2022
 Russian Supercup (3): 2014, 2015, 2017
 Nikolaev Cup (5): 2016, 2017, 2018, 2021, 2022
 European Rugby Continental Shield (2): 2016–17, 2017–18

Record in European Games

Wins against Tier 1 pro teams

Club staff

Head coach – Alexander Pervukhin 

Assistant coach – Vakil Valeev 

Forwards coach – Roman Romak 

Backs coach – Rynhardt van As 

Head of Strength and Conditioning coach – Igor Vashkevich 

Fitness coach – Andrey Mosolov 

Reserve team Head coach – Yuri Krasnobaev

Current squad

2022 Rugby Premier League

International honours

References

External links
 Official website 

Rugby clubs established in 1975
Russian rugby union teams
Sport in Krasnoyarsk